Abhijnanashakuntalam (Devanagari: अभिज्ञानशाकुन्तलम्, IAST: Abhijñānaśākuntalam), also known as Shakuntala, The Recognition of Shakuntala, The Sign of Shakuntala, and many other variants, is a Sanskrit play by the ancient Indian poet Kālidāsa, dramatizing the story of Śakuntalā told in the epic Mahābhārata and regarded as best of Kālidāsa's works. Its exact date is uncertain, but Kālidāsa is often placed in the 4th century CE.

Origin of Kālidāsa's play

Plots similar to the play appear in earlier texts. There is a story mentioned in the Mahābhārata. A story of similar plot appear in the Buddhist Jātaka tales as well. In the Mahābhārata the story appears as a precursor to the Pāṇḍava and Kaurava lineages. In the story King Duṣyanta and Śakuntalā meet in the forest and get estranged and ultimately reunited. Their son Bharata is said to have laid the foundation of the dynasty that ultimately led to Kauravas and Pāṇḍavas.

Title
Manuscripts differ on what its exact title is. Usual variants are Abhijñānaśakuntalā, Abhijñānaśākuntala, Abhijñānaśakuntalam and Abhijñānaśākuntalam. The Sanskrit title means pertaining to the recognition of Shakuntala, so a literal translation could be Of Śakuntalā who is recognized. The title is sometimes translated as The token-for-recognition of Śakuntalā or The Sign of Śakuntalā. Titles of the play in published translations include Sacontalá or The Fatal Ring and Śakoontalá or The Lost Ring. A more recent translation by Barbara Stoler Miller (1984) was entitled Sakuntala and the Ring of Recollection. The well-received Clay Sanskrit Library translation of 2006 is entitled The Recognition of Shakúntala.

Synopsis

The protagonist is Śakuntalā, daughter of the sage Viśvāmitra and the apsara Menakā. Abandoned at birth by her parents, Śakuntalā is reared in the secluded hermitage of the sage Kaṇva, and grows up a comely but innocent maiden.

While Kaṇva and the other elders of the hermitage are away on a pilgrimage, Duṣyanta, king of Hastināpura, comes hunting in the forest. Just as he was about to slay a deer, Vaikhānasa, a sage obstructs him saying that the deer was from the hermitage and must not be slayed. He politely requests the king to take his arrow back, to which the king complies. The sage then informs him that they are going to collect firewood for the sacrificial fire and asks him to join them. They then spot the hermitage of Sage Kaṇva and decide to pay the hermits a visit. However the king decides to go to this penance grove dressed up as a commoner. He also stops the chariot farther away to not disturb the hermits. The moment he enters the hermitage and spots Śakuntalā, he is captivated by her, courts her in royal style, and marries her. Soon, he has to leave to take care of affairs in the capital. The king gives her a ring which, as it turns out, will eventually have to be presented to him when she appears in his court to claim her place as queen.

One day, the anger-prone sage Durvāsa arrives when Śakuntala is lost in her thoughts, and when she fails to attend to him, he curses her by bewitching Duṣyanta into forgetting her existence. The only cure is for Śakuntala to show the king the signet ring that he gave her.

She later travels to meet him, and has to cross a river. The ring is lost when it slips off her hand as she dips it in the water playfully. On arrival the king is unable to recognize the person he married and therefore refuses to acknowledge her. Śakuntala is abandoned by her companions who declare that she should remain with her husband. They then return to the hermitage.

Fortunately, the ring is discovered by a fisherman in the belly of a fish, and presents it in the king's court. Duṣyanta realizes his mistake - too late. The newly wise Duṣyanta is asked to defeat an army of Asuras, and is rewarded by Indra with a journey through heaven. After returning to Earth years later, Duṣyanta finds Śakuntala and their son by chance, and recognizes them.

In other versions, especially the one found in the 'Mahābhārata', Śakuntala is not reunited until their son Bharata is born, and found by the king playing with lion cubs. Duṣyanta meets young Bharata and enquires about his parents, and finds out that Bharata is indeed his son. Bharata is an ancestor of the lineages of the Kauravas and Pāṇḍavas, who fought the epic war of the Mahābhārata. It is after this Bharata that India was given the name "Bhāratavarsha", the 'Land of Bharata'.

Reception

By the 18th century, Western poets were beginning to get acquainted with works of Indian literature and philosophy. Shakuntala was the first Indian drama to be translated into a Western language, by Sir William Jones in 1789. In the next 100 years, there were at least 46 translations in twelve European languages.

Sanskrit literature

Introduction in the West

Sacontalá or The Fatal Ring, Sir William Jones' translation of Kālidāsa's play, was first published in Calcutta, followed by European republications in 1790, 1792 and 1796. A German (by Georg Forster) and a French version of Jones' translation were published in 1791 and 1803 respectively. Goethe published an epigram about Shakuntala in 1791, and in his Faust he adopted a theatrical convention from the prologue of Kālidāsa's play. Karl Wilhelm Friedrich Schlegel's plan to translate the work into German never materialised, but he did however publish a translation of the Mahābhārata version of Śakuntalā's story in 1808. Goethe's epigram goes like this:

Education in British India
Shakuntala was disapproved of as a text for school and college students in the British Raj in the 19th century, as popular Indian literature was deemed, in the words of Charles Trevelyan, to be "marked with the greatest immorality and impurity", and Indian students were thought by colonial administrators to be insufficiently morally and intellectually advanced to read the Indian texts that were taught and praised in Britain.

Unfinished opera projects

When Leopold Schefer became a student of Antonio Salieri in September 1816, he had been working on an opera about Shakuntala for at least a decade, a project which he did however never complete. Franz Schubert, who had been a student of Salieri until at least December of the same year, started composing his Sakuntala opera,  701, in October 1820. Johann Philipp Neumann based the libretto for this opera on Kālidāsa's play, which he probably knew through one or more of the three German translations that had been published by that time. Schubert abandoned the work in April 1821 at the latest. A short extract of the unfinished score was published in 1829. Also Václav Tomášek left an incomplete Sakuntala opera.

New adaptations and editions
Kālidāsa's Śakuntalā was the model for the libretto of 's first opera, which premièred in 1853. In 1853 Monier Monier-Williams published the Sanskrit text of the play. Two years later he published an English translation of the play, under the title: Śakoontalá or The Lost Ring. A ballet version of Kālidāsa's play, Sacountalâ, on a libretto by Théophile Gautier and with music by Ernest Reyer, was first performed in Paris in 1858. A plot summary of the play was printed in the score edition of Karl Goldmark's Overture to Sakuntala, Op. 13 (1865). Sigismund Bachrich composed a Sakuntala ballet in 1884. Felix Weingartner's opera Sakuntala, with a libretto based on Kālidāsa's play, premièred the same year. Also Philipp Scharwenka's Sakuntala, a choral work on a text by Carl Wittkowsky, was published in 1884.

Bengali translations:
 Shakuntala (1854) by Iswar Chandra Vidyasagar
 Shakuntala (1895) by Abanindranath Tagore

Tamil translations include:
 Abigna Sakuntalam  (1938) by  Mahavidwan R.Raghava Iyengar. Translated  in sandam style.

Felix Woyrsch's incidental music for Kālidāsa's play, composed around 1886, is lost. Ignacy Jan Paderewski would have composed a Shakuntala opera, on a libretto by Catulle Mendès, in the first decade of the 20th century: the work is however no longer listed as extant in overviews of the composer's or librettist's oeuvre. Arthur W. Ryder published a new English translation of Shakuntala in 1912. Two years later he collaborated to an English performance version of the play.

Alfano's opera

Italian Franco Alfano composed an opera, named La leggenda di Sakùntala (The legend of Sakùntala) in its first version (1921) and simply Sakùntala in its second version (1952).

Further developments
Chinese translation:
 沙恭达罗 (1956) by Ji Xianlin

Fritz Racek's completion of Schubert's Sakontala was performed in Vienna in 1971. Another completion of the opera,  by Karl Aage Rasmussen, was published in 2005 and recorded in 2006. A scenic performance of this version was premièred in 2010.

Norwegian electronic musician Amethystium wrote a song called "Garden of Sakuntala" which can be found on the CD Aphelion. According to Philip Lutgendorf, the narrative of the movie Ram Teri Ganga Maili recapitulates the story of Shakuntala.

In Koodiyattam, the only surviving ancient Sanskrit theatre tradition, prominent in the state of Kerala on India, performances of Kālidāsa's plays are rare. However, legendary Kutiyattam artist and Natyashastra scholar Nātyāchārya Vidūshakaratnam Padma Shri Guru Māni Mādhava Chākyār has choreographed a Koodiyattam production of The Recognition of Sakuntala.

A production directed by Tarek Iskander was mounted for a run at London's Union Theatre in January and February 2009. The play is also appearing on a Toronto stage for the first time as part of the Harbourfront World Stage program. An adaptation by the Magis Theatre Company  featuring the music of Indian-American composer Rudresh Mahanthappa had its premiere at La MaMa E.T.C. in New York February 11–28, 2010.

Film adaptations 
It is one of the few classical Sanskrit plays that have been adapted to the silver screen in India and of them the most adapted (another being the Mṛcchakatika by Shudraka). These films mostly under the title of the heroine (Shakuntala) include ones in: 1920 by Suchet Singh, 1920 by Shree Nath Patankar, 1929 by Fatma Begum, 1931 by Mohan Dayaram Bhavnani, 1931 by J.J. Madan, 1932 by Sarvottam Badami, 1932 Hindi film, 1940 by Ellis Dungan, 1941 by Jyotish Bannerjee, 1943 by Shantaram Rajaram Vankudre, 1961 by Bhupen Hazarika, 1965 by Kunchacko, 1966 by Kamalakara Kameshwara Rao, and 2022 by Gunasekhar. A television film, titled Shakuntalam, was an adaptation of the play by Indian theatre director Vijaya Mehta.

Bharat Ek Khoj, a 1988 Indian historical drama television series by Shyam Benegal based on Jawaharlal Nehru's The Discovery of India (1946), included a two part adaptation of the play and Kalidasa's life which aired on DD National. A television series adaptation of the same name was produced by Sagar Arts and aired on the Indian television channel Star One in 2009. Shaakuntalam is a 2023 Telugu language film based on the play.

Notes

References

 
 
 
 
 

 
 
 
 
  Other on-line versions: 1920 reprint: Internet Archive – Online Library of Liberty 1928 reprint: Project Gutenberg2014 (The Floating Press): Google Books

External links
Abhijnana Sakuntalam - Transliterated text at GRETIL
Stop animation version by Patrick McCartney and Annie McCarthy (from the Australian National University).

Sanskrit plays
Works by Kalidasa
Indian plays adapted into films
Ancient Indian poems
Ancient indian Dramas